Heraclio Alfaro Fournier (September 20, 1893 – October 8, 1962) was an aviation pioneer, aeronautical engineer, and member of the Early Birds of Aviation.

Early life 
Born in Vitoria, Spain, Heraclio was the son of Juan Bautista Alfaro and grandson of Heraclius Fournier, founder of the famous card factory, Naipes Heraclio Fournier. At the Marianist school in that city, he was introduced to the nascent field of aviation by Louis Heintz.

References 

Members of the Early Birds of Aviation
1893 births
1962 deaths